Mette Sørensen (born 28 May 1975) is a retired female Danish badminton player. While competing in 2000 Olympics, she lost in the third round to 4th seeded Ye Zhaoying of China. She married Dutch born Danish badminton player Quinten van Dalm

Achievements

World Championships 
Women's singles

European Championships 
Women's singles

European Junior Championships 
Girls' singles

Girls' doubles

IBF Grand Prix 
Women's singles

Women's doubles

IBF International 
Women's singles

Women's doubles

References

External links 

Danish female badminton players
1975 births
Living people
Sportspeople from Aalborg
Olympic badminton players of Denmark
Badminton players at the 2000 Summer Olympics